Live from Brixton and Beyond is the first live album by British rock band Asking Alexandria. The album was announced on 17 November and released on 15 December 2014.

DVD Contents
Disc 1

– Brixton Behind the Scenes

Disc 2
- Bonus Concert: A Reckless Halloween
- All Music Videos (2009–2014)

References 

2014 live albums
Asking Alexandria albums
Sumerian Records albums